This is a list of medical schools located in Egypt.

Public schools of medicine
 Ain Shams University El-Demerdash Faculty of Medicine                   
 Al-Azhar University 
 Faculty of Medicine for Boys
 Faculty of Medicine for Girls
 Asyut Faculty of Medicine for Boys
 Damietta Faculty of Medicine
 Alexandria University Faculty of Medicine
 Assiut University Faculty of Medicine
 Aswan University Faculty of Medicine
 Benha University College of Human Medicine
 Beni Suef University Faculty of Medicine
 Cairo University Kasr Alainy School of Medicine
 Fayoum University Faculty of Medicine
 Helwan University Faculty of Medicine
 Kafrelsheikh University Faculty of Medicine
 Mansoura University Faculty of Medicine
 Menoufia University Faculty of Medicine
 Minia University Faculty of Medicine
 Port Said University Faculty of Medicine
 Sohag University Faculty of Medicine
 South Valley University Qena Faculty of Medicine
 Suez University Faculty of Medicine
 Suez Canal University Faculty of Medicine
 Tanta University Faculty of Medicine
 Zagazig University Faculty of Medicine

Private schools of medicine
 Arab Academy for Science, Technology and Maritime Transport College of Medicine
 Badr University in Cairo School of Medicine
 Delta University for Science and Technology Faculty of Medicine
 Galala University Faculty of Medicine
 Horus University Faculty of Medicine
 King Salman International University Faculty of Medicine
 Merit University Faculty of Medicine
 Misr University for Science and Technology College of Medicine
 Modern University for Technology and Information Faculty of Medicine
 Nahda University in Beni Suef Faculty of Medicine
 Newgiza University School of Medicine
 New Mansoura University Faculty of Medicine
 October 6 University Faculty of Medicine

Military schools of medicine
 Armed Forces College of Medicine

Public schools of dentistry
 Alexandria University Faculty of Dentistry
 Faculty of Dentistry Al-Azhar University - males (Cairo, Assiut)
 Faculty of Dentistry Al-Azhar University - females (Cairo)
 Faculty of Oral and Dental medicine, Cairo University
Faculty of Oral and Dental medicine, Assuit University

Private schools of dentistry
 Badr University in Cairo School of Dentistry
 British University in Egypt Faculty of Dentistry (Accredited by National authority quality assurance accreditation of education).
 Misr International University Faculty of Oral and Dental Medicine
 October 6 University (O6U) Faculty of Dentistry
 Delta University for Science and Technology Faculty of Dentistry
 Misr University for Science and Technology Faculty of Oral and Dental Medicine
 Nahda University Faculty of Oral and Dental Medicine
 New Giza University Faculty of Oral and Dental Medicine
 Future University in Egypt Faculty of Oral and Dental Medicine
Pharos University Faculty of Oral and Dental Medicine
Arab Academy for Science Technology & Maritime Transport, 
college of DENTISTRY ALAMEIN BRANCH,
https://www.aast.edu/en/colleges/#

See also
 Education in Egypt
 List of Egyptian universities

References

External links
 
 
 
 
 

Medical College
Egypt
 
Medical schools